JCE may refer to the following:

In publishing:

The Journal of Chemical Education
The Journal of Cardiovascular Electrophysiology, a scientific journal focusing on cardiac arrhythmias
The Journal of Comparative Economics

In education:

 Jerusalem College of Engineering, an Israeli Academic College for Engineering Studies, bestowing B.Sc. degrees
 Sri Jayachamarajendra College of Engineering, popularly known as JCE, an engineering college in India
 Jordanhill College of Education

In computing:

 JWPce file extension
 Java Cryptography Extension defines APIs for several encryption mechanisms
 Joomla Content Editor

Other:

Journey to the Center of the Earth
Junior Certificate
Joint criminal enterprise
Jackie Chan Emperor, a film production company owned by actor Jackie Chan